Suerte is Spanish for "luck".  It may also refer to:

Suerte River, a river in Costa Rica
Suerte is Alejandro Fantino
"Suerte" , a 2012 single by Paty Cantú from Corazón Bipolar
 "Suerte", a Spanish version of the Shakira song "Whenever, Wherever"
 "Suerte", a Spanish version of "Lucky" by Jason Mraz featuring Ximena Sariñana
Señor Suerte, alias used by Marvel comic characters